Chen v Home Secretary was a decision of the European Court of Justice which decided that a minor who is a national of a European Union member state has the right to reside in the European Union with his or her third-country national parents, provided the minor and parents have health insurance and will not become a burden on the public finances of the member state of residence.

This case led to the Twenty-seventh Amendment of the Constitution of Ireland, which limited the constitutional right to Irish citizenship of individuals born on the island of Ireland to the children of Irish citizens and some others whose parents are not Irish citizens but who meet the prescribed criteria.

Facts
Kunqian Catherine Zhu was born on 16 September 2000 in Belfast to Chinese parents who were living in Wales (part of the United Kingdom) and working for a Chinese firm there. The child's mother, Man Lavette Chen, had selected Northern Ireland as a birthplace for her daughter so that she could gain Irish nationality. As Catherine's parents were only temporary migrants in the UK, she was not eligible for British citizenship simply by virtue of birth in the United Kingdom, as the United Kingdom abolished automatic jus soli in 1983.

However, by being born in Belfast, Catherine was entitled to Irish citizenship because at that time, anyone born on the island of Ireland had the automatic, unrestricted right to Irish citizenship. Thus, Mrs Chen obtained a passport and hence Irish citizenship for Catherine, with the intention of using Catherine's status as a European Union citizen to move the family permanently to Cardiff, Wales. However, British authorities rejected the family's application for permits to reside permanently in the United Kingdom. On appeal, adjudicator Michael Shrimpton of the Immigration Appellate Authority referred the decision to the European Court of Justice, which ruled that, as a citizen of the European Union, Catherine Zhu had a right under Article 18 of the EC Treaty to reside anywhere in the EU, and that denying residency to her parents at a time when she is unable to look after herself would conflict with this basic right.

Advocate General Tizzano stated that it was not an abuse of EU rights to take advantage of the Irish citizenship rules because it is for the Member States and not the EU to decide whether to confer citizenship on a person.

Judgment
The court ruled:

See also
Articles 2 and 3 of the Constitution of Ireland
British nationality law
British nationality law and the Republic of Ireland
Citizenship of the European Union
Common Travel Area
Irish nationality law
United States v. Wong Kim Ark

References

European nationality law
Irish laws
Court of Justice of the European Union case law
Immigrants to Ireland
2004 in case law
2004 in British law
United Kingdom immigration case law